Chaukhara is a town and Nagar panchayat in Domariaganj tehsil of Siddharthnagar district in the state of Uttar Pradesh, India.

Geography
It has an average elevation of 110 metres (360 feet). Chaukhara is situated in the swamp of northeastern Uttar Pradesh, only ten miles from the border of Nepal. It is 5 km from tehsil headquarters Domariaganj, 60 from district headquarters Siddharth Nagar, and 30 km from the border with Nepal. Chaukhara is situated in the plains between two rivers, Budhi Rapti to its north and Rapti to its south. Its climate is moderate, not very humid, with an average rainfall of about 50 inches. As the village is situated in the plains between two rivers, it recurrently suffers from the vagaries of floods. The total cultivated area is 711.6 acres, of which about one third is single-crop area.

Historical background 

In 1955, there were 296 houses; the number in 1965 had increased to 321. The total population in 1955 was 1,372; in 1965 it had increased to 1,475. The social stratification system of the village is reflected in the location of major caste streets. There are six such streets, each named after the caste group predominantly inhabiting that area. All the streets slope downward to north, south, east, and west from a central plateau on which stand the big houses (havelis) of the Rajputs, the ex zamindars (landlords). Adjacent to the Rajput street in the southward direction is the street of Brahmans; adjoining its eastern flank is the street of Ahirs. To the north of the Rajput street is the street of Banias, which, in the northeast, is surrounded by the street of Lohars, Badhais, Kumhärs, etc. in the north by the street of Muslims, and to the far northwest by the street of the lower castes, such as the Dhobis and Chamärs. The contour of settlement and proximity with the Rajput street has traditionally been a mark of relative social status for the inhabitants.

The village was traditionally under the joint zamindari system of land settlement and was dominated by the Rajputs. The gazetteer of Basti and the village customs register (sharayat-wajibul-arza) provide some historical facts about the period of the establishment of power by the Rajput zamindārs. The Rajputs who belong to the Kalhans subcaste settled in this village during the year 1554 AD, after pushing out the local tribes, the Tharus and Domkatars. They had originally migrated from  Baglana Gujarat. Until the establishment of British rule, this Rajput clan ruled over about surrounding twenty-five villages. Now the clan is subdivided and scattered into six villages of the region.

The social hierarchy and status of various castes can also be observed through the style and structure of their houses. The houses of Rajputs are bigger and more spacious than those of other castes; some stand two stories high and most of them have a sitting hall outside the main building. The houses of Banias and intermediate castes are smaller, stand on lower plinths, and generally have mud walls. The lower of the untouchable castes have very small houses with two or three rooms without plinths and are congested. Formerly, their houses used to be covered with straw but today most of them are tiled.

The transport facilities, which a decade back were very poor, have improved considerably. Chaukhara is now connected by regular bus service to the nearby towns.

It has one primary school for boys, which was started in 1885; another primary school for girls was established in 1941. A post office was opened in 1945, which has now grown in size. A zamindär financed the establishment of a junior high school in 1963, which has been recognized by the State Department of Education.

Two crops, kharif (summer crops) and rabi (winter crops), are grown in the village. The kharif crops are sown in the months of June July and harvested in the months of September October. The main kharif crops are paddy, maize, pulses, and a coarse grain called kodon. The main rabi crops are wheat, barley, peas, mustard, and sugar cane. Most of the sugar cane is crushed in the village itself and converted into coarse sugar for consumption. Only a few big farmers cultivate sugar cane as a cash crop.

Among fruits, mangoes grow in large quantities. There are six mango orchards covering about fifteen acres of land, all owned by Rajputs. Four other mango orchards are not of an improved variety.Guavas and bananas also grow in small quantities.
 
There are three temples, one mosque, and four other sacred spots in the village. The temples are devoted to the gods Rama and Krishna.The mosque serves the religious needs of the Muslims. The sacred spots are located at the outskirts of the village boundary.The goddess Kali, the serpent god Naga, the god Bhairon, and the evil spirit Nat are supposed to preside over these sacred places. Regular prayers and rituals are conducted at the three temples only. Seasonal offerings are made to Kali and the god Någa. In the past, when epidemics were frequent, collective prayers were offered daily or even many times during a single day, especially the seat of the goddess Kali. Now, only once in the year, that too according to the convenience of individual families, offerings are made at the seat of Käli. Nat and Bhairon are the gods of the lower castes and they continue to be worshiped as in the past.

Caste structure

There are twenty-four Hindu and ten Muslim castes and subcastes in Chaukhara. Among them, Rajputs have always had the highest social status, honor, and power. They continue as the most influential group. Caste hierarchy in this respect represents the model of "Rajput domination"; unlike other parts of India, Brahmans, especially in secular matters, are subordinated to Rajputs.
All the Hindu castes can be arranged as follows in six status categories on the scale of the prestige and power they have in the social system:

I. Rajput (12, 16); Brahman (23, 32)

II. Bania (32, 20)

III. Ahir (30, 32); Kurmi (23, 28); Murao (5, 4); Sonar (5,5); Halwai (3, 2); Thather (3,2)

IV. Kahar (14, 15); Bari (10, 14); Mali (4, 4); Badhai (3, 3); Lobar (3, 2); Kumbar (1. 4): Bhooj (2, 2); Dharkar (1,5); Arakh (7,6); Nai (3, 3)

V. Nat (3, 3); Teli (1, 1); Chamár (46, 52); Dhobi (4,4)

VI. Hela (2, 2)

(The figures in parentheses show the number of households of each caste in 1955 and 1965 respectively.)

The sixty-one Muslim families are divided into ten subcastes which can be arranged in four status categories:

1. Pathan (4,4)
II. Muslim (Shekh) (9,9)

III. Kujra (17, 19); Ansar (10, 10); 
Manihar (10, 11);  Nai (1,1); Darzi (2, 2)

IV. Bhat (1, 1); Peelwan (1, 1); Faqir (3, 3)

The Kalhans Rajputs are widespread in the districts of Gonda, Bahraich, Barabanki, Balrampur, Gorakhpur, Siddharth Nagar, and Basti in eastern Uttar Pradesh.

Their ancestor Maharaja Kesri Singh was a powerful chief who ruled over vast areas in Basti, Siddharth Nagar, Gonda and Nepal.

In course of time his estate disintegrated and his descendants divided the estate; they became less powerful and turned into zamindars.

All Kalhans Rajputs do not maintain close ties of kinship and ritual obligations throughout the district. The rule of subcaste endagamy is, however, strictly adhered to by all.

Rajputs in Chaukhara are organized into two patrilineages called patti or thoka. Pattis form the basis of ritual, kinship, factional, and economic relationships.

The name of the patti is derived from the location of the patti households. The two pattis are, therefore, called poorab (eastern) and paschim (western) pattis on this basis. Each patti has a separate tradition for celebration of life cycle rituals.

Each has a separate patti deity. All rituals are celebrated on a patti basis; a few members from the other patti are invited on such occasions if relations are cordial. Patti solidarity constitutes an important ingredient of the traditional social organization of the Rajputs, which plays a very important role in the intercaste relationship of the village. 

In 1965 the western patti consisted of three families and the eastern patti of thirteen families.

Rajputs practice hypergamy and there is a regional localization in their selection of brides and grooms which extends to a radius of about a hundred miles.

Consequently, their interpersonal communication link ages and kinship ties are much extended, giving them additional influence  and power. Traditionally they have been rulers and they continue to enjoy high prestige and power. The accept kachcha (raw) or pucca (cooked) food cooked by Brahmans but do not accept kachcha food cooked at the home of any other caste. From the castes in categories II, III, and IV they accept kachcha food if it is cooked at their own house holds. They consider it beneath their dignity to accept kachcha food cooked at the residence of other clean castes.

The relationship between Rajputs and Brahmans is of an ambivalent nature. Ritually, Brahmans are respected and held as sacred. On ceremonial occasions Rajputs touch the feet of Brahmans. The common style of Rajput respect toward a Brahman is to announce "Palagan," which means "I touch your feet." But in secular matters Rajputs take precedence over Brahmans. The basis of ambivalence or contradiction lies in the economic system and agrarian class structure. To some extent, the model of Rajput domination follows from the "kingly model" of the traditional Hindu structure of power and statecraft which offered Brahmans the highest spiritual and normative authority but alienated them from the sphere of secular power.

Brahmans are divided into two subcastes: Tripathi and Pande. Both claim caste status. Pandes are numerically stronger (eighteen families) and their main occupation is the priesthood. Tripathis engage primarily in supervisory farming. One Tripathi family has completely given up the priestly calling, since the head of this family serve as a secondary school teacher and cultivates about ten acres of farmland. Brahmans do not accept kachacha food from any other caste and follow strict rules of commensal purity. Ten years ago, none of the Brahmans accepted service as priests for untouchables but today one Brahman family is serving them; this is frowned upon by other Brahmans despite its being tolerated.

Banias occupy the next higher position in the Hindu caste hierarchy. All of them belong to the Agarwal subcaste. A few Banias have traditionally enjoyed high prestige in the village owing to their wealth. Rajputs would treat a very wealthy Bania with a good deal of respect, because at a time of difficulty they may have to borrow from him. But the relationship changes with the fortunes of the Banias. The position of the Brahman, on the other hand, does not undergo any such change, being based on sacred-normative rather than utilitarian considerations.

The Hindu castes in the third and fourth status categories are ritually clean. They can touch Rajputs, Brahmans, and Banias and enter into their houses.

Ahirs are by tradition a shepherd and cultivating caste. During the days of zamindari, they worked as personal attendants and sepoys to zamindärs. 

Kurmis are agriculturists and are reputed to be good cultivators. Muraos sell vegetables. Sonars, though traditionally gold smiths, now sell sweets and other merchandise. Halwais, traditionally confectioners, maintain that occupation. Thathers specialize in the sale and repair of brassware. The traditional occupations of all the castes in the third status category, except for the Sonars, remain unchanged.

In the fourth status group are mainly the service castes. Traditionally, Kahars and Baris were domestic servants in the families of Rajputs.

The subsidiary occupation of Kahars was fishing and of Baris making leaf-plates (pattals) for use at public feasts, Today, most of them have given up their traditional occupation. 
Kahars have opened betel shops and teashops and Baris work as vendors of sweets and other edibles. 

Mális used to be village florists and attendants to the goddess Kali. Traditionally, they were essential mediums for any rituals or sacrifices offered to this goddess.
 
As epidemics are now less frequent, the rituals at the altar of Kali have dwindled. This has forced Mälis to take to cultivation as the main source of livelihood. 
Other castes, such as Badhais (carpenters), Lohars (ironsmiths), Kumhars (potters), and Dharkars (basketmakers), are artisans and earn through jajmáni relations with the other castes.
Nais (barbers) are also related to other castes through jajmani linkages but they mainly serve the Rajputs. 
Muslim Nais, however, serve especially the lower castes.
The castes in categories V and VI are "untouchables." Among them, Chamars are numerically predominant. Most of them are landless and work as laborers. When they have land, their holdings are very small, on an average less than an acre. In the past they worked as plowmen (halwahas) to Rajputs. Many of them still continue to do so. A number of them now also work as rickshaw pullers and road builders. Child marriage and widow remarriage is customary among them. 
They are divided into two subcastes, Utaraha (northerners) and Dakhinha (southermers), probably on the basis of the direction of their immigration. But a major cause for this subdivision is that Dakhinha Chamärs used to eat beef of carrions, which was not approved by the other Chamars. This practice has now ceased. The traditional occupation of Bhoojs is the parching of grains; parched grain is a common form of food in this region. Arakhs were watchmen by tradition but now they have taken to agriculture. 
Nats,besides being snake charmers, manufacture and sell stone equipment. They are a nomadic group and their women go about begging, singing, and dancing. 
There is only one family of Telis in the village; they are oil crushers. While men press oil at home, their women go out selling oil to customers. 
Dhobis, as washermen, have not changed their main occupation.

Muslim subcastes are also endogamous and maintain social distance in accordance with caste hierarchy. Pathans have the highest position among them and claim to be Rajput converts to Islam. Next in hierarchy are the Muslims or Shekhs. Pathans and Shekhis deal in ready-made garments. 

Kujras (vegetable sellers), Ansars (weavers), Manihars (bangle dealers), Darzis (tailors), and Nais (barbers) enjoy equal social status but maintain the rule of caste endogamy, Village endogamy is also common among the Muslims and some lower Hindu castes but not among the uppercaste Hindus.The Bhats (bards), Peelvans (elephant drivers), and Faqirs (mendicants) have the lowest position among Muslims.

The relationship between Hindus and Muslims has always been cordial and harmonious. 

Muslims participate in Hindu festivals like Holi and Deepavali; similarly, Hindus take part with enthusiasm in the Muslim festival of Moharrum. 
  
In the history of the village there has been only one case (in 1943) of tension between the Muslims and Rajputs (not between Hindus and Muslims as such) on account of a land dispute for Karbala, the ground where Moharrum is celebrated. It was, however, resolved peacefully.
Rigidity in the enforcement of caste rules was highest among Brahmans, but they did not have a caste panchayat. 
Caste norms were imposed and held together by consensus. 
Cases of caste deviance have been rare among them. 
Only recently (1963) a Tripathi Brahman married his son to a girl from the Gossain (beggar-Brähman) subcaste, as he was offered a substantial dowry. This caused resentment among the Tripathi Brahmans, but barring one family (which still does not interdine with this family), others have accepted the deviant.

Like Brahmans, Rajputs, too, did not have a caste panchayat. Each patti had a council of elders which before the abolition of zamindari looked after matters relating to the caste norms as well as agrarian relations. 
But, unlike Brähmans, Rajputs tolerated a great deal of laxity in personal moral standards. There was greater permissiveness, especially in the field of commensal and sex rules for the males, Relations with lower-caste or untouchable women never led to the ostracization of males from the caste. 

During the British rule, Rajputs often interdined with English officers or invited them to shoot game (shikar); some of them also used to dine at the residence of a local Muslim zamindar, all this was, however, tolerated.

Thus, Rajputs, before the abolition of zamindari, were well on the way to westernization and liberalization. This mode of behavior was, however, confined only to the males; the females were kept under strict veil and authoritarian male domination. The very aged male members, too, used to regress to traditionalism, a feature which is so common in the Hindu mode of westernization.

Now, fifteen years after the abolition of zamindari, when economically and socially there has been a sea change in the condition of Rajputs, they have given up the traditional pomp and show of the westernized mode of living. Rather, they show overcommitment to traditionalism. 

Most of them are supporters of Jana Sangha, a conservative and tradition-oriented political party. Their older style of control on the village having gone, they now rationalize their condition in terms of the fatalistic theme of the Hindu tradition.

Banias also had no caste panchayat. They, too, are strict conformists to caste rules. Caste panchayats played a very important role in the social organization of the cultivating and service castes. Disputes connected with marriage, divorce, payment of gifts or bride price, and those related to property subdivision used to be decided by these panchayats. Caste panchayats also cut across village boundaries and led to the "horizontal solidarity of the system. 

These panchayats offered protection against the excessive exploitations of landlords. When a lardlord became too tyrannical, caste panchayats helped the victim to migrate and settle down in another village. 

Contrarywise, some less scrupulous members of a caste often attempted to evade the sanctions of a caste panchayat by taking shelter under the authority of a zamindar. Such cross-shelterings, which Bailey calls "bridge actions," functioned as sources of dynamics or change in the traditional social organization of the village.

Today, caste panchayats exist in name only. They seldom meet and very few people refer cases to them. This does not mean that caste solidarity has waned. On the contrary, new arenas have been opened in which castes function as solidary groups, such as village panchayats, local political groups, and political factions.

These developments have also been responsible for the decline in the interest of people in caste panchayats. Caste leaders now try to occupy leadership in a formally organized panchayat. Three fourths of the caste leaders of Chaukhara  are now members of the executive committee of the village panchayat, which is organized on rational administrative lines.
Caste, as a functioning system, has kept its major characteristics intact. 

Connubial rules are strictly maintained by all caste groups. During the last decade there were only two cases of violation of these norms. In one case an Ahir left his earlier wife to live with a Dharkar woman. In another case a Kahar started living with a woman from the Chamar caste. In both cases the deviant members were ostracized from their caste. The first event happened in 1949 and the second one in 1953. In both cases the women were from the lower castes and the men belonged to a higher caste; however, none of the castes were prepared to accept the deviants into their folds. The two families in the village exist alienated.

There is some relaxation in the commensal norms of various castes. Recently, a few teashops have sprung up in the village. These are run by Kahars. Except for a few Brahman and Rajput members, villagers, irre spective of caste affiliations, take tea prepared at these shops. Although some discrimination and some social distance are still maintained in serving tea to caste members according to their hierarchy, a great deal of liberalization in commensal rules is implicit in this change. Untouchability, however, still prevails. Even at the teashops, the untouchables are not allowed to sit on the benches or cots. They must sit on the ground and take tea from earthen pots and not from cups and saucers. 
By law, untouchability is an offense, but in reality it persists. One element of the caste system, however, seems to have been more responsive to change-hereditary caste occupations. Many castes, such as the Sonars, Kahars, Baris, Malis, and a few Brahmans, have now given up their traditional occupations.

Class structure 

An important element in the social system of Chaukhara is its class structure. The big farmers (ex-zamindärs), small cultivators (ex tenants), merchants, and landless agricultural laborers are the four major classes in the village. To a great extent the class structure overlaps with caste hierarchy. 
The farmers are Rajputs, most cultivators are Ahirs, Kummis, Muraos, and Malis. Merchants are mostly the Banías and a majority of the laborers belong to the Chamar caste. Nevertheless, in many respects, class relations also cut across caste ties. Recently, a few Brahmans have purchased land and have become substantial farmers.
Brahmans also compete with Rajputs for power.
Similarly, a few Kujras and Banias have started cultivation; Baris, Kahars, and Sonars have become shopkeepers and a few Ahirs and Kurmis have taken to working as laborers.
Despite these changes, class inclusiveness of caste remains intact. The question arises: In what sense can one employ the concept of class as a relevant and viable analytic category for the description of the rural social system?

The reality of class as pointed out by Max Weber lies in the "market situation and its accompanying features of polarization of economic interests and class consciousness. The bonds of mutual relationship within the class are associative, defined by an identity of economic and, following from that, of social and cultural deprivations and standards of achievements. Communal and particularistic relationships, as in the caste, are external to the sphere of relationship within the class situation. On these criterio, historically as well as existentially, farmers, merchants, cultivators, and laborers constitute social classes.

Historically, a conflict between the tenants and zamindars based on the contradictions of economic interests has persisted in Chaukhara for the last two or three decades, this conflict has taken diverse forms.

Class consciousness was first generated during 1936-37 when the Indian National Congress established an office in the village under the leadership of a Brahman, followed by three Chamar leaders (labor class), two Muslim merchant leaders, and one Ahir leader. This was the beginning of the agitations for land reforms, fair wages, abolition of begår (forced labor), security of tenancy rights, and legalization of land cultivated by tenants on a sharecropping basis and under oral tenancy.

Prior to 1937, the hold of the feudal pattern of class structure was strong on the rural social organization. Interclass relationship under this system was an ensemble of reciprocity and domination based, on the one hand, on caste values and, on the other, on the economic domination of Rajputs. Economic domination had, however, not been completely differentiated from the interlinkages of caste relationships. Class relations were dominated by the jajmani system as well as by zamindari. Both these institutions together constituted the traditional rural social organization. The institution of zamindari, however, deeply influenced the functioning of the jajmini system.

The elements of reciprocity and domination in jajmäni relationships have been variously described by different sociologists who have worked in different regions. In Chaukhara, however, jajmáni relations were dominated by the Rajputs. Rajput zamindar families, which were or ganized into two pattis, constituted the subunits through which many jajmani relations were defined before the abolition of zamindari. All households of the service castes, laborers, merchants, and cultivators were subdivided and their services shared pattiwise. The functionary castes within a patti were further subdivided into individual shares of zamindar families. Chamars served as plowmen, the cultivating castes were tenants, the merchants paid house tax, and the service castes attended to the Rajput zamindar families in various capacities. 

In return each caste or occupational group was paid grains by the Rajputs, but often rent-free land was also allotted for cultivation. Usually, landlords gave some extra land apart from that as jajmäni payment; this used to be on oral tenure, on which rent was claimed. As jajmans, if Rajputs were dissatisfied, they used to threaten the withdrawal of this additional land. Seldom did they withdraw land given in lieu of the jajmäni services, however, because of the scarcity of service castes and partly because these castes were well organized through caste panchayats. Moreover, within the village itself each patti of Rajputs formed a faction which was too ready to help the service castes from another patti in escaping the retribution of its zamindārs.

A traditional rivalry between the Rajputs of the eastern and western pattis has existed. Originally, the property shares of both pattis were equal, that is, eight annas in a rupee each; but in a famine, when the Rajputs of the eastern pattí were in difficulty, the western patti purchased two annas of their share and since then rivalry and animosity have existed between the two pattis. Moreover, up until 1953 the western patti con sisted of only one family, therefore it was more prosperous and this, too, has been a cause for envy among the Rajputs of the eastern patti. Taking advantage of the inter-patti rivalries, tenants often crossed over from one patti to another, which was a major source of litigation or dispute in the past.

These factions and rivalries served as dynamic and counterbalancing forces in the social equilibrium of Chaukhara under the system of zamindari. Each patti of Rajputs had a patti panchayat consisting of zamindar heads of various households and the leaders of various tenant castes belonging to the patti. This panchayat took decisions on matters pertaining to the tenant-zamindar relationship as well as inter-patti and inter- household problems among Rajputs. The jajmäni relations were, therefore, double-faceted: first, the relationship was class-dominated, espe cially where it referred to zamindärs as jajmäns and service castes as kamins. The class relations even in this case were not purely secular, since there were many aspects of relationships which were particularistic and bound by noneconomic and quasi-ritualistic obligations. Many cere monial forms of gift-payments were common between the zamindars and the service castes and tenants. The clement of domination, however, persisted in the intercaste relationship owing to the economic strength of zamindars, and thus aspects of class exploitation were introduced into this pattern of relationship.

The second facet of the jaimani relationship was reciprocity, particularly in the form the relationship took among the non-zamindar castes. At this level, definite rules of reciprocity for the mode of payment, as well as with regard to service obligations, prevailed. In case of conflict in this sphere, the caste panchayat used to intervene, failing that, the panchayats of the respective pattis arbitrated.

Today, the major class groups in order of the influence or power they command in the village are: the farmers or the supervisory cultivators, the merchants, the cultivators, and the landless laborers. The average farmholding of a Rajput farmer is 25.0 acres; for the Brahmans it is only 2.4 acres. There are ten families of Rajputs with landownership of more than 20 acres and two families of Brahmans having a landholding of more than 7 acres (one family has 7.3 and the other 10.2 acres). Both Rajputs and Brahmans do supervisory farming, since tilling of the soil with a plow is considered to be sinful by them. Only four families of merchants are well-to-do (with monthly incomes of more than four hundred rupees); others live just above the subsistence level. Unlike other groups, however, merchants are more mobile and have greater initiative. The average landholding of cultivators is 2.1 acres; only three cultivators have a holding of eight to nine acres. The agricultural laborers, too, have some land in their possession, but on an average it is less than 0.5 acre per family; they, of course, cultivate some additional land as sharecroppers but on the whole most of them are still engaged in labor and depend upon wage earnings.

These four classes represent distinctive economic interests, which also to a great extent are mutually oppositional. Historically speaking, a long tradition of conflicts between farmers or ex zamindars on the one hand and cultivators and laborers on the other has existed. The bases of these conflicts were agrarian and political.

In the existing class hierarchy, Rajputs are on the top of the scale of economic power, social influence and prestige. Education and literacy are highest among them.
Next to Rajputs are the two households of Brahman farmers. Brahmans, too, are advanced in education and social awareness. Most agricultural innovations, such as the sinking of tube wells, the use of tractors, and modern plows, and the use of improved varieties of seeds and fertilizers, have been introduced either by Rajputs or by Brahmans. In contrast to them, the standard of literacy and the motivation for new enterprises are less strong among the small-size cultivators. Much of this is due to their economic handicaps, which perpetuate the vicious cycle of their backwardness,

Merchants, on the other hand, are more progressive and mobile. Twenty of their families, which were not doing well in this village, left between 1955 and 1965 for Nepal, where business prospects appeared better. Many of the remaining merchants have left their traditional street and have built shops on the outskirts of the village along the side of the road running to Nepal. Their motivation for enterprise seems to be stronger. In political matters, merchants have always played a neutral role and have rarely come into conflict with the Rajputs. The highly politicized groups in this regard are the ex-tenants and the untouchable laborers.

Family structure 

Various regional studies have revealed a diversity of patterns in rural family structures. The pattern of family differs on the basis of the caste and class levels of groups. Joint families are more predominant at the upper levels of caste and class than at the lower levels, where the frequency is of the nuclear types of families. Generally, the ideals of the joint family persist and are reinforced by the continuity of its traditional normative themes through myths, legends, and epic stories perpetuated by the oral and shashtric traditions. 

Some myths of the Hindu tradition have served as ideal patterns for family life. The idealized themes of family in the village are: 

 authoritarianism and high masculinism;
 positive evaluation of age hierarchical relations;
 emphasis on horizontal spread of solidarity based on kinship ties; 
 idealization of family jointness in terms of traditional honor and prestige. 

Each of these themes leads to many subsidiary norms; for instance, emphasis on masculinism leads to preference for male issue, low status of daughter in the family, low status of women and their subordination to males, segregation of females from a greater part of the cultural life of males, and development of a separate subculture of women in the rural society. 
Similarly, the other normative themes are also interlinked with a number of subsidiary norms. The expectation of conformity to these normative themes varies on the basis of caste affiliations, the conformity to them being highest among the upper castes and lowest among the untouchable and lower castes. However, the pattern exists as an ideal to be emulated by all groups if the existential situations permitted.

In Chaukhara there is a predominance of joint families among the upper castes (Rajputs, Brahmans, and Banias) and among the intermediate castes (Kurmis, Ahirs, Muraos, etc.); the upper castes have joint families in 36.37 per cent of the cases, semi-joint families in 41.56 per cent of the cases, and nuclear families in only 22.83 per cent of the cases. 

Similarly, the cultivating and intermediate castes have joint families in 45.00 per cent of the cases, semi-joint families in 25.83 per cent of the cases, and nuclear families in 29.17 per cent of the cases.

The structure of family among the lower (untouchable) castes is just the opposite of the pattem found among the upper and intermediate castes. In their case, 54.84 per cent of the families are of the nuclear type, 29.03 per cent are of the semi-joint type, and only 16.13 per cent are fully joint. The pattern among the Muslims tends to be closer to the lower castes than to the upper. Of their total families, 34.43 per cent are nuclear, 39.34 per cent are semi-joint, and only 26.23 per cent are fully joint.

Evidently, passing from the upper castes and classes to those in the lower hierarchy, there is a weakening in conformity to the traditional family ideal. The upper castes have the maximum number of joint families, presumably because they have the maximum number of cases of joint ownership and wealth and property. Their historical tradition also helps in the perpetuation of the joint family pattern.

Joint and semi-joint families are also common among the intermediate castes. In their case, too, the agricultural occupation and land holdings seem to sustain the motivation for jointness. The rules of marriage and the status of women in this group are much different than in the upper castes. Both men and women work in the field and enjoy greater freedom of movement and equality of status. Widow remarriage is common; as are marriage by exchange and the custom of bride price payment. Payment of dowry was never practiced by these castes until recently when some rich Kurmis started paying and demanding dowry at the marriage of their daughters and sons, emulating the Rajputs in this practice as a mark of prestige.
  
In marriage patrilocal rule of residence is common, but there are also two cases of gharjamai or matrilocal residence among the Kahars. There is one case of polygamy in a Muro family, where the husband has two wives who live in the village and look after his land and be, himself, does business in Calcutta. He has recently purchased some land from a Rajput in the village.

The predominance of nuclear families among the lower castes may also be due to economic reasons. As these castes do not possess sufficient land and have no substantial property to hold the interest of members to the joint family norm, the young behave more independently and break away from the parental family authority at the slightest provoca tion. Women, too, are independent; they leave one husband to live with another if they are not treated properly or if their marital life is not happy. Authority system within the family in these cases is rather equali tarian and presents a distinct contrast to the pattern found among the upper castes, Child marriage is still prevalent among the lower castes. Marriage by elopement is also accepted, after a feast is given to the elders of the biradari, or the extended kan group of the husband, through the caste panchayat.

Village exogamy is a norm in marital choices of all the Hindu castes. Muslims, on the other hand, do marry within the village. However, they follow the norm common in the rest of the village and marry within the village under tare circumstances only. Most of them also live in joint and semi-joint families.

Power structure 

The administration of the village is run by a village panchayat, which has an elected executive committee consisting of the village president, vice-president, and twenty-eight members. The key office is the presidentship, which is held by an ex-zamindar Rajput. He is about forty and a member of the dominant faction of Rajputs.

His election to this office was, however, unanimous. The panchayat system was established for mally in 1949 by a legislative act to replace the system of administrative control during the period of zamindari. Zamindari was subsequently abolished in 1950.

There have been three elections of this new panchayat, one each in 1949, 1953, and 1962. Rajputs were completely out of power in the panchayats of 1949 and 1953. In both these elections, a Brahman leader associated with the Congress movement, about whom mention has been made earlier, led the panchayat. He was a leader of the ex tenants, who were solidly supporting him against the Rajputs.

The present Rajput domination, after a lapse of power for about a decade, has resulted from the economic vulnerability of the ex-tenants and the successful maneuvering of the situation by the Rajputs. It has come about after a long-drawn period of conflict, but the present reconciliation, though in some respects coercive, was achieved smoothly.

As mentioned earlier, seeds of conflict in the village were sown in 1936-37 with the growth of a Congress leadership supported by three Muslims, three Chamars and one Ahir and Brahman each. The Brahman who owns a substantial farm and teaches in a secondary school, was the leader of this whole movement. 

The Rajput zamindārs were opposed to the Congress for two reasons: 

 The Congress was mobilizing tenants for agrarian reforms, and advocated the abolition of begår (forced labor), the payment of low wages to persons working on the zamindar's farm, and permanent tenancy rights on sharecropped land and on land held under tenancy at will, which were sources of power to zamindārs.
 All Rajputs with the exception of one family were members of the Aman Sabha (committee for peace), an organization created by the British government that violently opposed the struggle for independence.

These differences polarized the tenants and zamindars into two opposite groups in the arena of power politics of the village. The conflict in one form or another continued until 1955-56 and finally subsided only in 1962, with the unanimous election of a Rajput and ex zamindar as the village president. What happened in between this period offers a meaningful case study in the dynamics of rural power structure.

A series of conflicts took place between 1957 and 1956, each one having its basis in the agrarian movement and tensions resulting from tenant-zamindar relations. Curiously, these conflicts united the Rajputs of both pattis irrespective of their factional animosities. Similarly, they also united all other castes simply on the basis of their being tenants. These various conflicts could be classified according to the following types: 

 between service castes and zamindärs for better wages;
 between Brahman leaders and zamindars on account of land disputes and political differences;
 between tenants and zamindärs during correction of land records;
 between ex-tenants and ex-zamindars on the election issues;
 between the same parties on the issue of consolidation of landholdings.

A brief account of these conflicts in a chronological sequence follows. In 1937, just after establishment of the Congress office in the village, a Kahar family, working as domestic servants in the household of a zamindar of the eastern patti, refused to work unless, in addition to the existing land of 1.6 acres, they were granted more land or salary. The zamindar tried to put pressure on the Kahar but failed because of the unity of all other service castes.

The same year, a Chamar plowman of the western patti also demanded more wages and in this case, too, succeeded in getting an increase after a few days of hartal (strike). Two similar cases of tensions between the Chamars and Rajputs also took place in 1938. 

In 1939 a conflict ensued between the Brahman leader (Congress worker) and his zamindar, since the latter, angered by the political activism of the Brahman, withdrew the land he had given him for sharecropping The Brahman, however, forcibly occupied this land, which led to a protracted litigation between the two parties.

These conflicts only prepared the grounds for more organized and large-scale conflicts between tenants and zamindars later during the Land Records Operations in 1945 and 1947. These operations were meant to correct ownership rights to land; during the course of the operations, revenue officials checked from plot to plot and entered the names of those who claimed ownership on the basis of oral witnesses on the spot. So it was easy for any united group to contest the ownership of zamindars to the land cultivated or possessed by the group. This was done quite thoroughly by the tenants in 1945 when they claimed about 100 acres of Rajput land. 
For every case of contested ownership, zamindars had to being suits to protect their rights. Since the tenants were well united, it was difficult for Zamindari to find witnesses in support of their rights except from among themselves, which they did. Following this movement, 108 law suits were registered; only three suits had tenants as both the contesting parties; in the rest, the concerned parties were the zamindats and the tenants. Of these 108 suits, tenants won in 53, and in this manner about 20 acres of land passed from the zumindārs to the tenants. In 1947 the same pattern was repeated, but this time, since the zamindars were also prepared, out of 52 claims, tenants could win in only 18 cases.The panchayat elections of 1949 and 1953 were held under the shadow of these conflicts. In both elections zamindärs tried to capture office but failed. The new panchayats were entrusted with many responsibilities which were of deep concern to the zamindärs. Panchayats could levy taxes, auction common pastures and ponds, and report cases of sharecropping and oral tenancy for formal land records; in addition, they held the responsibility for all improvement works in the village. All applications for government loans were to be forwarded through the president of the village panchayat. Hence, the Rajputs were keen to have control over this organization.

But as their attempts to control the village panchayat failed, they adopted the tactics of foiling the work of the panchayat; they would not pay the taxes and levies imposed by the new panchayat; they refused to contribute for the improvement of roads, rather, they fanned or created disaffection among the extenants by explosting the interfaction and interstreet rivalries. 
Most of all, they involved about seven key persons from the extenant group in false law suits and victimized many others by refusing them land for sharecropping. They offered economic patron age only to those who supported them in various maneuvers for securing power. The economic disparities between the Rajputs and the non Rajputs being great indeed, these economic sanctions had a telling effect on the morale of the ex-tenants. Nevertheless, until 1956 ex tenants resisted the pressures exercised by the zamindars.

In 1956 another land reform, consolidation of landholdings, took place in Chaukhara. Once again the ex-tenants planned to take advantage of the connection of land records, which preceded the actual consolidation. This time, however, false claims were made on the holdings of each other by both the ex-zamindars and the ex-tenants. This deterred many ex-tenants from bringing forward false claims. Also this time the extenants as well as the Rajpats were sufficiently divided among themselves. Each one of them was anxious to secure better plots through consolidation. Most benefits, however, accrued to the zamindars, since they had the biggest holdings in the village.

The failure of ex-tenants to secure benefits through consolidation, and simultaneously the division that this caused among both Rajputs and non-Rajputs, changed the form of intergroup relationship in the village. Between 1956 and 1962 (when the village unanimously elected a Rajput as the president of the village panchayat) the populistic orientation of the extenants had considerably subsided. The Rajputs, too, had by then realized the need for a redefinition of their scale of values and expectations. The years of conflict had disrupted the equilibrium of the economic and cultural life of the village. Rama Lila, Moharrum, Holi, and a host of other festivals, which in the past were jointly organized with the good will of all, had, during the interim period, deteriorated and were being used for factional ends. Many ex-tenants were suffering losses because they were not given land for sharecropping or on oral tenancy.

The causes of these changes were: 

 a redefinition of the expectations and aspirations of the ex-tenants and ex-zamindars in view of the changes in the social situation; 
 failure of the populistic movement of the ex-tenants due to the lack of economic power,
 absence of external (Congress Party or other political groups) help to the ex-tenants and their consequent apathy toward further conflicts;
 failure both of the abolition of zamindari and of the ceiling on land holdings, as measures of land reform, to bring about a radical improvement in the economic and social status of the ex-tenants; and
 continued economic and social superiority of the Rajput exzamindārs.

Cultural structure 

Hinduism and Islam are the two cultural streams which flow side by side in life of Chaukhara. Over the centuries, both have interacted and formed a blend which is clearly evident in the cultural practices and beliefs of the two communities. 
The important rituals and festivals of the 243 Muslims, who belong to the Sunni sect of Islam, are Moharrum, Meclad, Giarahwin Shaif, Shabe-barat, Ramzan, and Id. Among the important Hindu festivals are Rama Navami, Krishna Ashtami, Deepavali, Dussehra, and Holi. Apart from these a number of other festivals also are celebrated. Among the Muslim festivals, Moharrum is celebrated by both the low and intermediate caste Hindus. A fair is held on this day in the village and tazias (paper models of coffins) are displayed and ceremoniously buried in the memory of Hasan and Hussain, the two descendants of Prophet Mohammed.

Some twenty years ago even the Rajputs and Brahmans used to make tazias, but since a conflict between Muslims and Rajputs in 1943, in connection with the land for Karbala (where tazias are buried), they gave up this custom; they still, however, patronize this festival by helping Muslims celebrate it. Other Muslim rituals are not shared by the Hindus, since they have to do with Islamic religious beliefs. Among the major Hindu festivals, Muslims participate in Dasera, Holi, and Deepavali. During the period of zamindari, Muslims, too, presented gifts to the Rajput zamindars on Dussehra; now they only help in the organization of the Rama Lila (a religious dance-drama) enacted on this occasion. They also decorate their shops for this festival and help in making the paper effigy of the demon king Ravana, which is burnt at the conclusion of the Rama Lila. During Holi, a festival of colors at the dawn of spring, many Muslims visit their Hindu friends and participate in color ceremonies. In Deepavali, a festival of lights, Muslims also decorate their shops with lights. Despite these interactions, Muslims do maintain a distinct culture of their own. They have a mosque located in their street and hold most of their cultural and religious functions there.

On Rama Navami, the birthdate of the god Rama, and Krishna Ashtami, the birthdate of the god Krishna, two major dance dramas on the adventures of these heroes are celebrated; they are Rama Lila and Kamsa Vadha, which are major sources of recreation for the village folk. The Kamsa Vadha drama is played during the month of Shravana (July August) and Rama Lila in the month of Chaitta (March–April). Both dance-dramas are connected with legends from the Hindu epics and are enacted by Brahman actors, since the roles are often those of gods and deities. These roles being sacred, lower castes are not supposed to play them. Holi is a highly equalitarian and joyful festival in which everyone participates without much distinction of traditional status. All indulge in revelries and throw colored dust on one another. Finally, sweets and food are distributed. Deepavali is celebrated by all Hindus with a display of lights, but it has a special significance for the Banias, who worship the goddess of wealth, Lakshmi, on this day. Similarly, Dussehra is a special festival for Rajputs, who attach martial significance to it and spend the day in worshiping weapons and the family deity.

The lower and untouchable castes celebrate these festivals but keep a discreet distance from the upper castes. They receive gifts on the occasion of these festivals from their upper caste patrons. One difference between upper and lower-caste ceremonial practices is that, apart from the above shashtric or Hindu calendric festivals, the lower-caste Hindus also have some ceremonies and rituals connected with the worship of ghosts and spirits. The Chamars and Helas worship Bhairon and Nat (an evil spirit) and practice many magico-religious rituals. Once or twice a year these spirits reveal themselves by possessing individuals of these castes, One Hela and one Chamar are known for being such mediums, and when they are possessed, the men and women from their castes offer them drinks and victuals and in return receive omens. In the past, these omens carried great sanctions with them. Now, with the people's growing faith in modern medicines and the control of diseases such as cholera, malaria, and plague, through modern medical means, the omens of the mediums carry much less sanction for the villagers, and there are many in the village who look at this spectacle with unbelieving amusement.

Despite these changes, the belief in the traditional values of karma, rebirth, and moksha and the sacerdotal character of all beings still persists.

The various life cycle rituals (samskaras) are strictly performed by all Hindus. Yet, there are changes taking place. A Brahman priest has given up the traditional calling, he holds a university degree, is highly politicized, and teaches in a secondary school. Other Brahmans no longer send their promising sons to traditional pathashalas or religious seminaries but to modern schools, colleges, and universities. These college educated youths look down upon the traditional priestly occupation and covet professional and white-collar jobs. Slowly, changes are also taking place in other values of the people, especially those related to the concepts of pollution and purity and the outlook toward modem education and science. In due course, a new equilibrium of the value system might emerge through a synthesis between the new and the old values.

Elements of persistence in the system 

Major changes have taken place in the social and cultural life of Chaukhara. Nevertheless, many traditional forms of relationships and values continue. The changes may be analyzed, as Linton suggested, through the logic of the "cores" and "the fluid zones" of cultural forms and their structural interlinkages.

Making a distinction between the folk and modem culture on this basis, Linton writes:

In this context, the above formulation of Linton's may be accepted with two qualifying statements: first, that the village constitutes a "part culture"; second, that the "core" of its cultural tradition is institutionalized as an extension of the Great Traditions, primarily the Hindu, sometimes the Muslim, Christian, and other traditions. In Chaukhara, there are two major cultural-religious traditions interacting and persisting together, the major Hindu tradition and the minor Muslim tradition.

Elements of persistence may be found in the institutional ramifications of both traditions. Intercaste distance and conformity to caste or subcaste norms persist among Hindus as well as among Muslims. All the major caste rituals are observed. Pollution as a value frame of the caste system still persists. Despite the fact that untouchability is now an offense by law, it is observed and the untouchables acquiesce in it, if not willingly, yet with indifference. The functioning of the easte system shows a great degree of persistence in respect of the connubial and kinship norms and regulations. Occupational and jajmäni obligations associated with caste have undergone only slight modification. Persistence may also be found in the substantive nuclei of power. Rajputs continue to maintain their position as the traditional power group. The basic economy of the village remains subsistence oriented and continues to be dominated by the ex zamindārs.

Traditional patterns also persist in the form and functioning of the family system. Extended and semi-joint families are common among the upper and intermediate castes. This form of family is the most pre dominant in the village. In six cases, where people have migrated to cities with their nuclear families, they invariably maintain functional links with the traditional joint family, they visit it regularly, contribute financially for agricultural development or purchase of land, and consult as well as are consulted in marriage negotiations of their members and on other important decision-making processes. The savings made through carmings in the city often go into purchase of land, which reveals the extent to which familistic and agrarian values are dominant among the villagers. That among the lower castes there is a predominance of nuclear families and lack of familistic authoritarianism is no new phenomenon. In fact, probably owing to the exigencies of economic situations, such a family pattern among the lower castes has persisted through the Hindu tradition.

Similarly, the core values of the Hindu world view have still a hold on the psychology and behavior of the people. The themes of predestination, cosmic unity of all life, otherworldliness, and religious asceticism continue to be expounded and extolled not only by the upper castes but also by the castes in the lower hierarchy of the Hindu tradition. All these norms, however, are not quite translated into action, but they serve as ideal patterns or ideal value themes. They provide reinforcement to the perpetuation of traditional values through fostering psychological continuity of attitudes. Although at the metaphysical level the structure of the Islamic tradition differs from the Hindu tradition, in actual life many themes or value structures prevailing among Muslims are identical to those of the Hindus. This may be a result of their centuries long interaction in an identical existential situation, which has survived the forces of religious schisms and contradictions.
Similarities in value themes of the Hindus and Muslims have been pointed out by many sociologists; Ishwaran writes: "The three main religious groups are the Hindas, the Jaim, and the Muis, although the last of these functions as a caste group as well. Though in matters of theology and doctrine these groups may differ, yet they are knit together into a single working system thanks to the all pervasive Hindu outlook. Thus, one may see how all three groups resemble one another with regard to their value system and ritualistic feems."

The elements of change

Broadly speaking, the structural changes in the social system of the village have not been as profound as changes which could be called institutional, or developmental. The positional framework of the system of social stratification remains unchanged. Rajputs and a few Brahmans continue to dominate the power structure and prestige hierarchy. Significant role differentiations and an adaptive "upgraded" institutionalization, which are the necessary preconditions for structural change, have not been much in evidence. Nevertheless, it would be a mistake to assume that the system has remained static.

The abolition of zamindari itself has contributed to some changes in the intergroup relationships which are structural in essence. It has automatically led to the abolition of certain important roles from the village social structure. For instance, the offices of village headman (mukhia) and revenue headman (lambardar) have been abolished. The structure and mode of functioning of the panchayat have been reorientated, rationalized, and interlinked with the national judiciary. This has brought about radical changes in the nature of the sanctions behind this institution. In this process the network of relationships of the reciprocal services group has also been uprooted to some extent. For more than a decade the Rajputs, who held power traditionally, were out of power in the village panchayat, and even when they regained it in 1962 the return was not to the traditional-authoritarian but to a somewhat consensual-democratic pattern.

Another aspect of change is in the occupational structure. Kahars and Baris, traditionally a servant caste, have now taken to shopkeeping, the Chamar plowmen are now pulling rickshaws; goldsmiths have become vendors; and Brähmans, supervisory farmers. These changes, though more symptomatic than statistically significant, reveal the facts of gradual diversification of occupational roles.

Even more significant than occupational changes are the changes that have taken place in the development fields. Compared to 1955, in 1965 many more children were going to schools. The number of urban migrants had gone up, communication had improved, and there were visible signs of betterment in the housing condition of the lower castes. Taking 1955 as the base year, the number of boys and girls going to school doubled in 1965 and the number of urban migrants increased sixfold. The village has been electrically connected and a number of shops of Banias now have electricity. The method of cultivation has improved. Two Rajputs have tractors for cultivation; three tube wells have been constructed; chemical fertilizers are accepted by all the cultivators and farmers and are increasingly being utilized. Win nowers, chaff cutters, and meston plows are now a common sight in the households of farmers. Ten years back, about 80 per cent of the houses of Chamars were covered with straw thatch; now about 70 per cent of them are tiled and a few also have brick walls.

Major changes have taken place in the values and attitudes of Rajputs and non-Rajputs. Now the men and women from the lower and untouchable castes openly chew betal leaves and wear chappals (sandals) and silver omaments which they were proscribed to use in the days of Zamindari; the lower caste men ride on bicycles openly and can use umbrellas in the presence of a Rajput, which a few decades back would not have been possible. Rajputs look at these changes with tactful indifference and always try to win the support of the non-Rajput castes. People in the village still address Rajputs with respect but the traditional attitude of servility and impotent humility has disappeared.

Many traditional festivals are now organized on a rational and collective basis. For Ráma Lila, Kansa Vadha, and Moharrum the respective communities raise subscriptions. In these festivals the use of sound amplifiers is quite common. Playing records of film music is now popular on the occasions of marriage, birth, or other joyful ceremonies and festivals. Thus, modern media of communication have been adopted for the perpetuation of traditional ways of life.

The nature of withdrawal from or commitment to tradition is not identical for the Brahmans and Rajputs, on the contrary, in some respects the two are in contradistinction. Thirty years ago Rajputs were more modemized; they invited British officers for hunting parties; they used to play tennis and had a tennis court built in the village, they also possessed motor cars and wore Western style dress. Now Rajputs have given up their attachment to Western clothes and a Western way of  life. On the contrary, they profess overcommitment to the traditional Indian values and rationalize their loss after the abolition of zamindari in terms of traditional doctrines of karma or destiny. Most of them support Jana Sangha, a tradition-oriented political party. Brahmans, on the other hand, are rapidly westernizing. With increasing prosperity and education, they tend to develop apathy towards their traditional callings.

In the sphere of values, an important change has taken place with regard to magico-religious beliefs, which have declined. Traditional medicine men or ojhas are still consulted for illness or possession, but in most cases the villagers' first choice now is a medical doctor and a dispensary, and only in the second place are medicine men consulted.

Overall, Chaukhara remains traditional, but the nature of traditionalism has itself undergone major changes. Behavior patterns have ceased to "continue from generation to generation" without change, as is characteristic of a traditional society. People's attitudes toward work and nature are changing. Motivation for acceptance of development innovations is high. Persistent jolts that intergroup relations have received through class conflicts have also weakened, if not abolished, the hold of authoritarian hierarchical values on the pattern of social relationships. The relatively closed social structure of the village is gradually being rendered more open to the inflow of new values and opportunities and may well be on the path to rapid change if existential factors do not controvert the process.

References

Villages in Siddharthnagar district